The 2015 Bonnaroo Music Festival was held June 11–14, 2015 in Manchester, Tennessee. This marked the 14th time the festival has been held since its inception in 2002.

In mid-December 2014, Bonnaroo announced there would be clues hinting at which artists would be on the lineup for 2015. They posted "The 12 Days of RooClues" on their official Instagram and Snapchat. A segment on RooRadio later revealed that the answers to these clues were Glass Animals, Sturgill Simpson, Dopapod, Houndmouth, Bleachers, Moon Taxi, Trampled By Turtles, Flume, The War on Drugs, Tears For Fears, Belle and Sebastian, and Robert Plant.

In mid-January 2015, the Bonnaroo lineup was officially announced by a process in which fans called a hotline (1-844-ROO-2015) to learn the name of one artist on the official lineup and subsequently shared it on social media using the hashtag "#Bonnaroo". The hotline was only open for a few hours on the date of the lineup announcement. Bonnaroo released an official lineup announcement video when all the artists had been shared by the fans on social media.

Line-up

Thursday, June 11
(artists listed from earliest to latest set times)

This Tent:
Unlocking the Truth
Strand Of Oaks
Iceage
The Growlers
Courtney Barnett
Mac Demarco
That Tent:
Dej Loaf
Dopapod 
Houndmouth
Tove Lo
Jungle
The Other Tent:
Ryn Weaver
Temples
Glass Animals
Benjamin Booker
Gramatik
Comedy Theatre:
Kurt Braunohler, Cameron Esposito, Ron Funches, & Jamie Lee (2 sets)
Dan Soder, Big Jay Oakerson, Ari Shaffir, & Robert Kelly (2 sets)
New Music On Tap Lounge brewed by Miller Lite:
Radiolucent
Future Thieves
Dark Waves
Ximena Sariñana
Broncho
The Who Stage (Communion Music):
Parlour Tricks
Little May
Raury
Bear's Den
Rubblebucket
Silent Disco:
Quickie Mart
The Unsheathed
Matoma
Quickie Mart
Cinema Tent:
Green Screens Presented by Rock The Earth: After the Spill - Q&A with director Jon Bowermaster
Trainwreck - Advance Screening
HBO Presents: Game of Thrones Season 5, Episode 6 (Unbowed, Unbent, Unbroken)
NBA Finals Game 4
Back to the Future 30th Anniversary Quote-Along Screening
Enchantment Under The Sea Dance Party - Love Music
[IFC] and The Action Pack Present: R. Kelly’s Trapped in the Closet 10th Anniversary Sing-Along
Solar Stage:
Bonnaroots Dinner (with music from Wailing Loons)
Raising Caine
Snake & Jake's Christmas Club Barn
Tiki Disco
New Breed Brass Band
Full Service Party
Snicklefritz
Tiki Disco

Friday, June 12
(artists listed from earliest to latest set times)

What Stage:
Soja
Dawes
Alabama Shakes
Kendrick Lamar
Deadmau5
Which Stage:
Brownout Presents Brown Sabbath
Royal Blood
Moon Taxi
Atmosphere
Ben Harper and the Innocent Criminals
Earth Wind & Fire
This Tent:
Tanya Tagaq
Against Me!
Guster
Tears For Fears
Run the Jewels
Odesza
That Tent:
Pallbearer
Between the Buried & Me
Rustie
Kacey Musgraves
Medeski, Scofield, Martin, & Wood
STS9
The Other Tent:
The Districts
King Gizzard & the Lizard Wizard
Unknown Mortal Orchestra
Sylvan Esso
Ben Folds & YMusic
Flying Lotus
Comedy Theatre:
Kurt Braunohler, Cameron Esposito, Ron Funches, & Matt McCarthy
Kurt Braunohler, Cameron Esposito, Ron Funches, & Jamie Lee
Nick Thune, Natasha Leggero, Ian Edwards, & Michelle Wolfe (2 sets)
New Music On Tap Lounge brewed by Miller Lite:
Fruition
The Jason McMillan Band
Tor Miller
Boy Named Banjo
Homemade Wine
BC Camplight
The Dø
The Who Stage:
Nothing More
Joel Woods
Elle King
Mini Mansions
Gabriel Garzón-Montano
Clear Plastic Masks
Twiddle
Hudson K
Silent Disco:
Motion Potion
Attom
The Unsheathed
Motion Potion
Matoma
DJ Prince Hakim
Cinema Tent:
Green Screens Presented by Rock The Earth: Merchants of Doubt - Q&A with producer Melissa Robeldo and former Congressman Bob Inglis
The Ultimate Corey Feldman Party: The Goonies 30th Anniversary Quote-Along screening
The Ultimate Corey Feldman Party: Live Performance: Corey Feldman & the Angels
The Ultimate Corey Feldman Party: The Lost Boys Quote-Along screening
Being Evel - advance screening
HBO Presents: Game of Thrones Season 5, Episode 7 (The Gift)
Austin to Boston - Introduction by Mumford & Sons' Ben Lovett, director Marcus Haney, and producer/editor Ty Johnson
Back to the Future Part II
Clueless 20th Anniversary Quote-Along screening
Solar Stage:
Vinyasa Kevin Courtney
Vinyasa Kevin Courtney
Adam Gardner (Guster) Rock the Earth Interview
Heritage Radio Burned: Stories of Food Truck Fails & Fixes
Schlafly: Localism and Its Effect on the Craft Beer Movement
Big Freedia: A Red Bull Music Academy Conversation
Bonnaroots Dinner with music from Wailing Loons
Snake & Jake's Christmas Club Barn:
Full Service Party
New Breed Brass Band
Full Service Party
Full Service Party
Jon Cleary & the Absolute Monster Gentlemen
Tiki Disco
Tropical Party (Tiki Disco)
Tiki Disco

Saturday, June 13
(artists listed from earliest to latest set times)

What Stage:
Trampled By Turtles
Hozier
My Morning Jacket
Mumford & Sons
Which Stage:
Songhoy Blues
Rhiannon Giddens
The War on Drugs
Gary Clark Jr.
Childish Gambino
Bassnectar
This Tent:
Priory
Catfish and the Bottlemen
Woods
Bleachers
Belle and Sebastian
Slayer
D'Angelo and the Vanguard
That Tent:
Jon Cleary & the Absolute Monster Gentlemen
Gregory Alan Isakov
Bahamas
Sturgill Simpson
Atomic Bomb! Who Is William Onyeabor? Feat. Jamie Lidell, Charles Lloyd, Luke Jenner, Money Mark, Pat Mahoney, Sinkane, & Mike Floss
Tycho
Flume
The Other Tent:
So Percussion
PHOX
SZA
Jamie xx
SBTRKT
Throwback Superjam Dance Party featuring Pretty Lights, Run DMC, Rob Trujillo, Jack Antonoff, Chance the Rapper, Reggie Watts, Eric Krasno, Jamie Lidell, John Medeski, Karl Denson, Oteil Burbridge, Robert Searight, Brian Coogan, & Brownout Horns - with special guests Cherub, Rhiannon Giddens and more!
Comedy Theatre:
Ralphie May, Jeff Ross, & Mark Normand (2 sets)
Chris Hardwick & April Richardson (2 sets)
New Music On Tap Lounge brewed by Miller Lite:
Son Little
Kevin Garrett 
Kandace Springs
Wild Adriatic
Highly Suspect
Mispers 
Smooth Hound Smith
The Who Stage:
Jesse Terry
Kaleo
Phoebe Ryan
Falls
X Ambassadors
Basecamp
All Them Witches
Silent Disco:
E.Feld
Snicklefritz 
Tiki Disco
DJ Logic
Different Sleep
Nuri
Childish Major
El Dusty
Mike Gao
Cinema Tent:
Heartworn Highways Revisited - Screening, Q&A with director Wayne Price and Live Music with Bobby Bare Jr., Shelly Colvin, and Jonny Fritz
Birdman - Film + Live Drum Score Performance by Antonio Sánchez
Sex & Drugs & Rock & Roll - Q&A with Denis Leary, Elizabeth Gillies, and Robert Kelly
HBO Presents: Game of Thrones Season 5, Episode 8 (Hardhome)
Mean Girls Quote-Along screening
Salad Days: A Decade of Punk in Washington DC (1980-1990)
Back to the Future Part III
Zoolander Quote-Along screening
Solar Stage:
Vinyasa Alison Cramer
Meditation with The Art of Living
Vinyasa Alison Cramer (with DJ)
Taylor & Griffin Goldsmith (of Dawes) Rock the Earth Interview & Performance
Heritage Radio Wasted: Drinking Stories & Sustainability
Lagunitas: Hop Vapin'
Cider Relay Competition Presented by Angry Orchard Hard Cider
Bonnaroots Dinner with music from Wailing Loons
Snake & Jake's Christmas Club Barn:
Full Service Party
NOLA Bounce Party (Full Service Party)
Full Service Party 
Full Service Party
Vogue Dance-Off (Full Service Party)
Robe Rage (with special guest band)
90's Rave Party (Full Service Party)

Sunday, June 14
(artists listed from earliest to latest set times)

What Stage:
Twenty One Pilots
Spoon
Florence and the Machine
Billy Joel
Which Stage:
Pokey Lafarge
Madisen Ward and the Mama Bear
AWOLNATION
Brandi Carlile
Robert Plant & the Sensational Space Shifters
This Tent:
Christopher Denny
Hiss Golden Messenger
The Very Best
Rudimental
G-Eazy
That Tent:
Shakey Graves
Hurray for the Riff Raff
Béla Fleck & Abigail Washburn
Jerry Douglas Presents Earls of Leicester
Punch Brothers
The Lonesome Trio
The Bluegrass Situation SuperJam hosted by Ed Helms
The Other Tent:
Jessica Hernandez & the Deltas
Shabazz Palaces
MØ
Freddie Gibbs & Madlib
Caribou
HBO Now Presents: Game of Thrones Season 5 Finale (Mother's Mercy)
Comedy Theatre:
Reggie Watts & Matt McCarthy (2 sets)
New Music On Tap Lounge brewed by Miller Lite:
Chrome Pony
Future Unlimited
Sol Cat
Mick Jenkins
Silent Disco:
DJ Logic
The Who Stage:
Grey Season
De Lux
Knox Hamilton
A Thousand Horses
The Wind and the Wave
Betty Who
Cinema Tent:
Béla Fleck: How To Write a Banjo Concerto - Screening, Q&A, and Live Performance
Jaco - screening and Q&A with director Paul Marchand and producer Robert Trujillo
Eden - advanced screening
HBO presents: Game of Thrones Season 5, Episode 9 (The Dance of Dragons)
NBA Finals Game 5
Solar Stage:
Breathing with The Art of Living
The Lone Bellow (Performance & Interview)
Roadkill Ghost Choir (Performance & Interview)
Music For Social Change (The Black Lillies & special guests, presented by Oxfam)
Carolina Chocolate Drops (Performance & Interview)
The Sweet Treats
Booker T: A Red Bull Music Academy Conversation
Discussion with Appalachian Citizens' Law Center
Mawre (African Drum/Dance)
Sonic Stage:
Vinyasa Sheri Celentano
Breathing with Isha Foundation
Vinyasa Sheri Celentano
Gregory Alan Isakov Rock the Earth Interview & Performance
Heritage Radio Crowd Sourced: An Open Mic for Food Rants, Raves, & Readings
2nd Annual Broo'ers Superjam with Musical Guests
Hurray for the Riff Raff Rock the Earth Interview & Performance
Global Citizen Special Performance
The Sweet Treats Featuring members of Raising Caine
Snake & Jake's Christmas Club Barn:
Full Service Party
Classic Hip Hop Party (Full Service Party)
Dance Hall Reggae (Full Service Party)
Full Service Party

References

External links
Official website

Bonnaroo Music Festival by year
Bonnaroo
Bonnaroo
2015 music festivals
Bonnaroo